The Catechism Debate, also known as Historikerstreit 2.0, is a debate about German Holocaust remembrance initiated by Australian historian A. Dirk Moses with his 2021 essay "The German Catechism". In the debate, Moses challenges the uniqueness of the Holocaust. In May through August of 2021, scholars reacted to Moses's thesis in the New Fascism Syllabus in a series of reflections curated by Jennifer V. Evans.

References

2021 in Germany
Holocaust commemoration
Genocide of indigenous peoples